The 1931 Paris–Roubaix was the 32nd edition of the Paris–Roubaix, a classic one-day cycle race in France. The single day event was held on 5 April 1931 and stretched  from Paris to its end in a velodrome in Roubaix. The winner was Gaston Rebry from Belgium.

Results

References

Paris–Roubaix
Paris–Roubaix
Paris–Roubaix
Paris–Roubaix